Terminal (stylised as TERMINAL) is Japanese singer Salyu's second original album, released on January 17, 2007. It is currently her most commercially successful album, peaking at number 2 on Oricon's album charts, and is her only album to receive a gold certification from the RIAJ. The recording sessions for the album ended on December 1, 2006.

Track listing

Charts

Sales and certifications

Release history

References

2007 albums
Japanese-language albums
Salyu albums
Albums produced by Takeshi Kobayashi